Anne Herbert may refer to:
Anne Herbert (writer) (born 1952)
Anne Herbert, Countess of Pembroke, née Anne Parr, sister to Henry VIII's sixth wife, Katherine Parr, c.1514–1552
Lady Anne Clifford married name Anne Herbert, 1590–1676